Alford is a surname. Notable people with the surname include:

Alan F. Alford (born 1961), British writer on mythology
Andrew Alford (1904–1992), American inventor of antennas for radio navigation systems
Anthony Alford (born 1994), American baseball player
Billy Alford (born 1981), American football player
Brian Alford (born 1975), American football player
Bruce Alford Jr. (born 1945), American football kicker
Bruce Alford Sr. (1922–2010), American football end
Bryce Alford (born 1995), American basketball player
Carl Alford (born 1972), English professional footballer
Chalmers Alford (1955–2008), American jazz guitarist
Charles Alford (1816–1898), Anglican bishop
Dale Alford (1916–2000), American politician from Arkansas
Darnell Alford (born 1977), American football player
Dave Alford, American drummer
Dean Alford (born 1953), American businessman and politician from Georgia
DeAundre Alford (born 1997), American football player
Dominic Alford (born 1988), American football player
Edna Alford (born 1947), Canadian author
Edward Alford (MP for Colchester) (c.1566–c.1632), English landowner and politician
Edward Alford (Royalist), English landowner and politician
Frank Alford (born 1901), English footballer
Gene Alford (1905–1972), American football player
Harry L. Alford (c.1879–1939), American arranger and composer
Henry Alford (disambiguation), several people, including:
Henry Alford (1810–1871), English churchman and scholar
Alford's Law, his rule for Biblical interpretation
Henry Alford, tried for murder 1963, hence Alford plea, American legal term 
Henry Alford (police officer) (1816–1892), South Australian mounted policeman, hotelier
Henry Alford (writer) (born 1962), American humorist and journalist
Henry King Alford (1852–1930), mayor of Toowoomba, Queensland
Jabe B. Alford (1850–1927), American politician
Jack Spencer Alford (born 1986), English author
Jay Alford (born 1983), American football player
Jeffrey Alford, American-born Canadian food writer
Jim Alford (1913–2004), Welsh track athlete
John Alford (disambiguation), multiple people with the name, including:
John Alford (actor) (born 1971), Scottish-born English actor
John Alford (cricketer) (born 1941), English cricketer
John Alford (died 1691) (1645–1691), MP for Midhurst and Bramber
John Alford (lutenist) (fl. 16th c.), English lutenist and translator of a treatise on the lute
John Alford (MP for Hedon) (died 1600), Member of Parliament (MP) for Hedon
John Alford (Parliamentarian) (c. 1590–1649), MP for New Shoreham in the Long Parliament
John Alford (priest) (1919–1995), Church of England priest
John Alford (professor) (1686–1761), established chair at Harvard
John M. Alford (1915–1988), U.S. Navy admiral
John R. Alford, American political scientist
Julius Caesar Alford (1799–1863), American politician
Kenneth J. Alford (1881–1945), English composer of many marches
Leon P. Alford (1877–1942), American mechanical engineer
Lynwood Alford (born 1963), American football player
M. A. Alford (born 1991), American artist
Maria Alford (1817–1888), English artist and art patron
Mario Alford (born 1992), American football player
Michael Alford (1587–1652), Jesuit missionary born in London, author of Fides Regia Britannica, 1663
Michael Alford (athletic director) (born 1969), College athletic director
Mike Alford (born 1943), American football player
Mimi Alford, alleged mistress of John F. Kennedy
Mitchell Cary Alford (1855–1914), Lieutenant Governor of Kentucky
Noel Alford (born 1932), Australian rules footballer
Paul Alford, Canadian football player of the early 1950s
Phillip Alford (born 1948), American actor
Robert Alford (born 1950), Canadian politician
Robert Alford (born 1988), American football player
Roger Alford (born 1580), English landowner and politician
Sam Alford (born 1986), English rugby union player
Sidney Alford, English explosives expert
Stephen Alford (born 1970), British historian
Steve Alford (born 1942), American politician
Steve Alford (born 1964), American basketball player and head coach
Ted Alford (born 1971), Canadian football player
Tony Alford (born 1968), American football player and coach
T. Alford-Smith (1864-1936), British geographer
William P. Alford (born 1948), Professor at Harvard Law School
William VanMeter Alford Jr., American Rear Admiral
W. R. (Red) Alford (1937–2003), American mathematician
Zack Alford, American drummer

See also
Allford (disambiguation), includes list of people with surname Allford